In molecular biology, GNAS antisense RNA (non-protein coding), also known as GNAS-AS1, is a long non-coding RNA.It is antisense to the GNAS gene. It is an imprinted gene, expressed only from the paternal allele, suggesting that it may have a role in suppression of the paternal NESP55 allele encoded by GNAS.

See also
 Long noncoding RNA

References

Further reading

Non-coding RNA